Denis Igorevich Laptev (Denis Igorevich Laptev; born 1 August 1991) is a Belarusian footballer who plays as a forward who plays for BATE Borisov.

Career
Laptev made his debut for the senior national side of his country on 7 June 2015, appearing as a second-half substitute in a friendly match against Russia.

He made his debut in the Russian Football National League for Tosno on 16 July 2015 in a game against Baikal Irkutsk.

Honours
Shakhtyor Soligorsk
Belarusian Cup winner: 2018–19

Dinamo Brest
Belarusian Premier League champion: 2019
Belarusian Super Cup winner: 2019, 2020

Torpedo Moscow
 Russian Football National League : 2021-22

Career statistics

References

External links
 
 
 Profile at pressball.by

1991 births
People from Mazyr
Sportspeople from Gomel Region
Living people
Belarusian footballers
Belarus international footballers
Association football forwards
FC Vertikal Kalinkovichi players
FC Slavia Mozyr players
FC Tosno players
FC Shakhtyor Soligorsk players
FC Dynamo Brest players
FC Rukh Brest players
FC Torpedo Moscow players
FC BATE Borisov players
Belarusian First League players
Belarusian Premier League players
Russian First League players
Russian Premier League players
Belarusian expatriate footballers
Expatriate footballers in Russia
Belarusian expatriate sportspeople in Russia